The Flavour Thesaurus: Pairings, recipes and ideas for the creative cook is a 2010 cookery book by Niki Segnit. It discusses 99 flavours divided into 16 categories and combined into 4851 pairings.

Reception
The Guardian called The Flavour Thesaurus a "superb book", writing "As you cannot write with scientific objectivity about taste without risking dullness .., the best approach is anecdotal, and this is where Segnit's book is elevated beyond mere usefulness to delight – she doesn't always give recipes with her entries, but when she does they are both simple and inspirational." The Independent listed it amongst the best books for Christmas 2010, called it "Original and prodigious in range", and wrote " its recondite market (cooks drawn to outré combinations) has been broadened with lively writing, but the section on oysters is more fallible than might be expected from a reference work."

The Flavour Thesaurus has also been reviewed by The Sunday Times, Foodtripper, Good, Library Journal, Booklist, Michigan Quarterly Review, and The Globe and Mail.

In addition to the UK and US editions, The Flavour Thesaurus has been translated into fourteen languages, including French, Russian and Japanese.

Awards 
 2010 British Book Design and Production Awards: Best Jacket/Cover Design - winner
 2010 André Simon Food Book of the Year - winner 
 2010 Galaxy National Book Awards: Tesco Food & Drink Book of the Year - shortlist
 2011 Jeremy Round Award for Best First Book - winner

References

2010 non-fiction books
British cookbooks